Emily Vacchiano (aka Emily Vaughan) is an American actress who has appeared in films, on television (credits include The Sopranos), and in several New York stage productions.

References

External links

Year of birth missing (living people)
Living people
Place of birth missing (living people)
American television actresses
21st-century American actresses